The 1999–2000 Utah Utes men's basketball team represented the University of Utah as a member of the Mountain West Conference during the 1999–2000 men's basketball season. Led by head coach Rick Majerus, the Utes finished with an overall record of 23–9 (10–4 WAC) and advanced to the second round of the NCAA tournament.

Roster

Schedule and results

|-
!colspan=9 style= | Non-conference regular season

|-
!colspan=9 style= | MWC Regular Season

|-
!colspan=9 style= | MWC Tournament
|-

|-
!colspan=9 style= | NCAA Tournament

Rankings

Team players in the 2000 NBA draft

References

Utah Utes men's basketball seasons
Utah
Utah
Utah Utes
Utah Utes